FnF, also known as Friends n Family, is a Bangladeshi drama serial which was first aired on 17 January 2010 on channel every Sundays and Mondays at 9:40pm.NTV, and as of 18 July 2010, "FnF" stopped airing. Redwan Rony, the writer of the popular Bengali drama serial House Full, is the director and the writer of FnF. The story of this drama serial revolves around Mr. Patwary and children, all living in the urbanised and developing city of Dhaka, along with their loving family and friends. The cast includes Abul Hayat, Partha Barua, Aupee Karim, Sumaiya Shimu, Anika Kabir Shokh, Mosharraf Karim, Rumel, Ahmed Rubel, MoMo Morshed, Schumonn Patwary, Saju Muntasher, Shahnaz Khushi, Nafa, Faruque Ahmed, Anika Akter Nupur, Fida Aeschylus Pidim, and Tania Ahmed.

Plot
Most of the major characters - Mr. Patwary (Abul Hayat), Bobby (Sumaiya Shimu), Chobi (Anika Kabir Shokh), Johir(Mosharraf Karim), Mostak(Ahmed Rubel) etc. get introduced to each other while travelling on a package tour destined for Sylhet. Their intimacy stays even after coming back to Dhaka. They keep running into each other on various occasions and their bonds grow even bigger. Eventually new relations form among them. Also various new characters get involved with their lives from time to time.

Cast
 Abul Hayat as Mr. Patwary
 Partha Barua as Mesbah
 Aupee Karim as Aupee
 Mosharraf Karim as Zohir
 Sumaiya Shimu as Bobby
 Anika Kabir Shokh as Chobi
 MoMo Morshed as Akkas
 Ishtiak Ahmed Rumel as Rocket
 Ahmed Rubel as Mostaq
 Schumonn Patwary as Rocket's brother-in-law
 Saju Muntasher as Saju
 Faruque Ahmed as Quddus
 Anika Akter Nupur as Quddus' wife
 Shahnaz Khushi as Quddus' girlfriend
 Fida Aeschylus Pidim as Rohan
 Dicon Noor as Boss
 Nauha Munir Dihan as Rocket's sister
 Nafisa Chowdhury Nafa as Rita

References

2010 Bangladeshi television series debuts
2010s Bangladeshi television series
Bangladeshi drama television series
Bengali-language television programming in Bangladesh
Television shows set in Dhaka
NTV (Bangladeshi TV channel) original programming